Aaron Ibilola (born 10 December 1997) is a Beninese footballer who plays as a midfielder or forward.

Club career
Ibilola spent part of his youth career with Benin's Tonnerre d'Abomey and in the United States with Chicago Magic PSG. He began his senior career with Brasilis in 2017, before joining Ponte Preta a year later. He made his debut in a Copa do Brasil tie against Internacional on 21 February 2018, prior to making his first Campeonato Paulista appearance during a home loss versus Bragantino in March. Five appearances later, Ibilola scored his first goal in a 3–1 defeat away to São Bento. In February 2019, Ibilola moved to Campeonato Paulista Segunda Divisão side Francana.

In early 2020, Ibilola had a trial with Polish III liga side Hutnik Kraków. He featured in a friendly with Stal Rzeszów.

International career
Ibilola represented Benin at U17 level. In April 2014, he scored three goals as Benin won the 2014 WAFU ‘B’ U-17 Championship held in Togo. Three months later, in July 2014, Ibilola scored in a 1–0 victory over Mali in 2015 African U-17 Championship qualifying. However, the result was later revoked after Benin featured four ineligible players, including Ibilola, in the match. He also received call-ups to the Benin U20s.

Career statistics
.

Honours
Benin U17
WAFU ‘B’ U-17 Championship: 2014

References

External links

1997 births
Living people
Place of birth missing (living people)
Beninese footballers
Association football midfielders
Association football forwards
Beninese expatriate footballers
Expatriate footballers in Brazil
Beninese expatriate sportspeople in Brazil
Campeonato Brasileiro Série B players
Associação Atlética Ponte Preta players
Associação Atlética Francana players
Benin youth international footballers